The Parochial Church Councils (Powers) Measure 1956 is a Measure passed by the Church Assembly of the Church of England that gave parish-level parochial church councils (PCCs) various miscellaneous powers such as framing an annual budget, power to make levy and collect a voluntary church rate, power jointly with the minister to appoint and dismiss the parish clerk and determine his salary, and the right to make representations to the bishop "with regard to any matter affecting the welfare of the church in the parish".

The measure forbade councils from acquiring property or real estate without the consent of the diocesan authority, and it also required PCCs to present their accounts annually, and invested bishops with the power to ensure the measure was followed.

The measure came into effect on 2 January 1957, and repealed the Parochial Church Councils (Powers) Measure 1921 and the Parochial Church Councils (Powers) (Amendment) Measure 1949.

References

Church of England legislation
1956 in Christianity
United Kingdom Acts of Parliament 1956